Junaid Nadir (born 7 July 1996) is an English cricketer who has played for Kent 2nd XI cricket team.

References

External links
 

1989 births
Living people
Pakistani cricketers
Islamabad cricketers
Cricketers from Okara, Pakistan